XHAAL-FM is a noncommercial radio station on 97.7 FM in Saltillo, Coahuila. The station is owned by Armando Sergio Fuentes Aguirre and is known as Radio Concierto with a cultural format.

History
XHAAL received its most recent permit on December 19, 2012, though its history dates to the 1990s. The station formally launched on February 27, 1997 after beginning programs in January, and President Ernesto Zedillo delivered a speech at the station's inauguration ceremony.

References

Radio stations in Coahuila
Radio stations established in 1997
Mass media in Saltillo